Michael Wilkins may refer to:

Michael Wilkins (Royal Marines officer), British general
Michael J. Wilkins, American lawyer
Mike Wilkins, English footballer